James B. Struzzi II (born 1967) is an American politician. He has served as a Republican member of the Pennsylvania House of Representatives, representing the 62nd district since December 1, 2018.

Personal life and education
James Struzzi II is a son of James Struzzi I and Anna Mae Struzzi. He had a brother, Michael, and a sister, Melissa.  Struzzi graduated from Penn-Trafford High School in 1985, and attended the University of Pittsburgh where he earned a degree in English writing and communication. He completed coursework for a master's degree in public administration at the Indiana University of Pennsylvania. James Struzzi II is married to Christina, with whom he has four children, Avianna, Talan, Zerich, and Vaughn.

Political career
Struzzi began working for the Pennsylvania Department of Transportation in 1999, as the community relations coordinator in District 10. He later became assistant press secretary for the Pittsburgh region of District 11. In 2013, Struzzi resigned from the PennDOT to succeed Dana Henry as the president of the Indiana County chamber of commerce. Struzzi announced in February 2018 that he was seeking the Republican Party nomination to succeed Dave L. Reed as member of the Pennsylvania House of Representatives in District 62. Struzzi faced Democratic Party nominee Logan Dellafiora as well as write-in candidate Daniel Wilson in the general election. Struzzi sought reelection in 2020, and will face Democratic candidate Dennis Semsick and independent Laura Thomas in the general election.

Committee assignments 

 Appropriations
 Children & Youth
 Human Services
 Insurance

References

1960s births
Living people
21st-century American politicians
Republican Party members of the Pennsylvania House of Representatives
Businesspeople from Pennsylvania
University of Pittsburgh alumni
Indiana University of Pennsylvania alumni
People from Indiana County, Pennsylvania
21st-century American businesspeople